is a Japanese former professional footballer who played as a midfielder.

Fujita played for Júbilo Iwata, Utrecht, Nagoya Grampus, Roasso Kumamoto and JEF United Chiba. He won five major titles during his time at Júbilo. He also gained 24 caps for the Japan national team between 1995 and 2005.

In July 2017 he became Head of Football Development (Asia) for English side Leeds United.

Club career
Fujita attended and played football at Shimizu Commercial High School and University of Tsukuba before joining Júbilo Iwata in 1994. Playing as a creative midfielder, Fujita has played an integral role in helping to build Júbilo Iwata into one of the most successful franchises in the J1 League.

Although Fujita is not as well known as some of his more illustrious teammates, this probably has more to do with his low-key manner and quiet efficiency rather than a lack of skills. As part of the Júbilo midfield, Fujita had an essential role in providing the transition from defense to attack. In 1999, his contributions to his team were recognized as he was made team captain and won the league MVP award.

Fujita joined FC Utrecht, a team of the Eredivisie, on loan in mid-2003. The team was unable to match the performances of the top-tier teams in the Netherlands. As a result, FC Utrecht were unwilling to pay the transfer fee required to keep Fujita and he returned to Japan to once again play for Júbilo Iwata at the end of 2003.

From 2004, Fujita played for Júbilo Iwata again. However, his opportunity to play decreased in 2005, he moved to Nagoya Grampus Eight (later Nagoya Grampus) in June 2005. His opportunity to play decreased in 2008 and he left the club end of the season. From 2009, he played for J2 League club Roasso Kumamoto (2009–10) and JEF United Chiba (2011). He announced his retirement in June 2012.

International career
On February 15, 1995, Fujita debuted for the Japan national team against Australia. In June 1999, he was selected by Japan for the first time in four years by manager Philippe Troussier. He played at 1999 Copa America. In 2001, he was selected by Japan for the 2001 FIFA Confederations Cup. He did not play in the match while Japan came second place.

In October 2003, he was selected Japan for the first time in four years by manager Zico. In 2004, he played in the 2006 FIFA World Cup qualification. He was also selected by Japan for the 2004 Asian Cup. While he did not play in the match, Japan won the title twice in a row. He played 24 games and scored 3 goals for Japan until 2005.

Japan Pro-Footballers Association (JPFA)
Fujita had been managing the Japan Pro-Footballers Association (JPFA, ja) as a chairman for five years with Tetsuro Kiyooka, FIFA players' agent as a chief operating officer and formed the organization as a trade union in 2011 as well as represented the all Japanese footballers and the Japan national football team to protect their rights and status.

Coaching career
In 2014 joined Dutch side VVV-Venlo as part of the coaching staff.

On July 21, 2017, it was announced he had left VVV-Venlo join English EFL Championship side Leeds United as Head of Football Development (Asia). On January 3, 2018, Leeds signed their first ever Japanese player, signing Japanese international Yosuke Ideguchi from Gamba Osaka. In late 2018, Fujita left his role with Leeds United to become head of international relations with the Japanese Football Federation.

Career statistics

Club

International

Scores and results list Japan's goal tally first, score column indicates score after each Fujita goal.

Honors
Júbilo Iwata
 J1 League: 1997, 1999, 2002
 J.League Cup: 1998
 Japanese Super Cup: 2000, 2003, 2004
 Asian Club Championship: 1998–99
 Asian Super Cup: 1999

Japan
 FIFA Confederations Cup: runner-up 2001
 AFC Asian Cup: 2004

Individual
 J.League Most Valuable Player: 2001
 J.League Best XI: 1998, 2001, 2002
 Japanese Footballer of the Year: 2002

References

External links

Japan National Football Team Database

1971 births
Living people
University of Tsukuba alumni
Association football people from Shizuoka Prefecture
Japanese footballers
Japan international footballers
J1 League players
J2 League players
Eredivisie players
Júbilo Iwata players
FC Utrecht players
Nagoya Grampus players
Roasso Kumamoto players
JEF United Chiba players
J1 League Player of the Year winners
Japanese Footballer of the Year winners
1999 Copa América players
2001 FIFA Confederations Cup players
2004 AFC Asian Cup players
AFC Asian Cup-winning players
Expatriate footballers in the Netherlands
Japanese expatriate sportspeople in the Netherlands
Japanese expatriate footballers
Association football midfielders
Leeds United F.C. non-playing staff
Presidents of the Japan Pro-Footballers Association